Oxycanus toxopeusi is a moth of the family Hepialidae. It can be found in New Guinea.

References

Moths described in 1956
Hepialidae